is a 2000 Japanese biographical film directed by Kaneto Shindo based on the life of actor Taiji Tonoyama.

The film is a series of vignettes from Taiji Tonoyama's life and film clips, interspersed with a dialogue to camera by Nobuko Otowa, addressing the camera as if she is addressing Tonoyama himself, recollecting events in his life.  The film focuses on Tonoyama's alcohol dependence and his various sexual relationships, as well as his film work with Shindo.

Plot

The first part of the film shows Tonoyama talking to a waitress, Kimie (Keiko Oginome), in a coffee shop. He then meets her father and asks him for permission to marry Kimie. The father asks him to first divorce his existing wife, Asako (Hideko Yoshida). In fact he is not married to Asako. To prevent him marrying Kimie, Asako then registers them as married.

The film moves through various episodes of Tonoyama making films with director Kaneto Shindo. At the time of The Naked Island, Tonoyama is close to death from alcohol poisoning, and is saved only by there not being anywhere to buy drinks. During the filming of Ningen and Onibaba, he repeatedly sneaks off to get drunk with actors Kei Satō and Kei Yamamoto. Director Shindo (played by himself) is seen as a distant, lonely figure, doing odd things such as burning driftwood in the rain or trying to catch fish in a pond where no fish are present.

Tonoyama moves in with Kimie. He explains to Kimie that he cannot have children due to a venereal disease caught from a prostitute. She adopts a son, Yasuo, her brother's child. Tonoyama goes to visit the other woman, whom he refers to as "Kamakura no baba" (the old woman in Kamakura) who has also adopted a daughter.

Tonoyama has repeated episodes of drinking or sex. Tonoyama, in order to avoid neighbourhood gossips, pretends to be going to work.

Cast

Although the story goes from Tonoyama's thirties to his death in his seventies, he and his two "wives" are played by the same people from start to finish. The various children in the film are played by different actors as they age.

Naoto Takenaka as Taiji Tonoyama
Hideko Yoshida as Asako
Keiko Oginome as Kimie
Nobuko Otowa as herself (addressing camera)
Kaneto Shindo as himself
Yasuhito Hida as Kei Satō
Kagetora Miura as Kei Yamamoto

The title By Player 

The English title of the film, By Player (the Japanese pronunciation of which can be romanized as Bai Pureiyā), is an English-like Japanese term (wasei-eigo) meaning "character actor."

Production

Nobuko Otowa's dialogue to camera was recorded six years before the rest of the film was made, before Otowa's death in 1994.

The film uses Tonoyama's life story to tell the story of Shindo's production company, Kindai Eiga Kyokai. Although it is based on Tonoyama's life, the dramatized scenes from Tonoyama's life are not based on witness accounts, but only on how Shindo imagined them. The film is based on Shindo's biography of Tonoyama.

References

External links

Films directed by Kaneto Shindo